Los Condores Airport  was a military airport near Iquique, a Pacific coastal city in the Tarapacá Region of Chile.

Google Earth Historical Imagery (6/12/2004) shows a  runway with a 240-metre compound wall bordering it midfield. Successive imagery show a deteriorating pavement with more walls and power lines along its length.

See also

Transport in Chile
List of airports in Chile

References

Defunct airports
Airports in Tarapacá Region